TFSD may refer to:

Twin Falls School District, the School District for Twin Falls, Idaho
The Free Software Definition